Alexander John Hillhouse (31 March 1907 – 3 March 1983) was an Australian athlete who competed in the 1932 Summer Olympics. He was born in Melbourne, and attended Mentone Grammar School. In 1932 he finished tenth the 5000 metres event. At the 1930 Empire Games he won the silver medal in the 3 miles competition as well as in the 2 miles steeplechase contest.

References

External links 
 
 
 
 

1907 births
1983 deaths
Athletes from Melbourne
Australian male long-distance runners
Australian male steeplechase runners
Olympic athletes of Australia
Athletes (track and field) at the 1932 Summer Olympics
Athletes (track and field) at the 1930 British Empire Games
Commonwealth Games silver medallists for Australia
Commonwealth Games medallists in athletics
20th-century Australian people
People educated at Mentone Grammar School
Sportsmen from Victoria (Australia)
Medallists at the 1930 British Empire Games